Nenad Đukanović (born 9 June 1971) is a Serbian former professional footballer who played as a midfielder.

Career
In his early career, Đukanović played in the Yugoslav Second League for GOŠK-Jug (1989–90), Sutjeska Nikšić (1990–91), and Radnički Beograd (1991–92). He later played for Čukarički in the First League of FR Yugoslavia.

In the summer of 1996, Đukanović signed for Partizan. He won the league title in his debut season with the club. In the 1998 winter transfer window, Đukanović moved abroad to Spain and joined Segunda División club Hércules.

In early 2000, Đukanović returned to FR Yugoslavia and rejoined Čukarički. He later briefly played for Železnik, before returning to Čukarički. In the 2003 winter transfer window, Đukanović moved to city rivals Rad, but failed to help them avoid relegation.

Honours
Partizan
 First League of FR Yugoslavia: 1996–97

References

External links
 
 
 

Association football midfielders
Expatriate footballers in Spain
First League of Serbia and Montenegro players
FK ČSK Čelarevo players
FK Čukarički players
FK Hajduk Kula players
FK Jedinstvo Ub players
FK Partizan players
FK Rad players
FK Radnički Beograd players
FK Sutjeska Nikšić players
FK Železnik players
Hércules CF players
NK GOŠK Dubrovnik players
Segunda División players
Serbia and Montenegro expatriate footballers
Serbia and Montenegro expatriate sportspeople in Spain
Serbia and Montenegro footballers
Serbian footballers
Yugoslav footballers
1971 births
Living people
People from Obrenovac